Courbet was an  central battery battleship of the French Navy.

Design

The  were authorized under the naval construction Program of 1872, which began with the ironclad  that year. Shortly thereafter, Italy began work on the very large s in the early 1870s, but the French initially ignored the development and instead chose to base the design for its next ironclad on that of Redoutable. The new ship was to be enlarged significantly to incorporate a more powerful armament. The resulting design was ordered for two vessels, Dévastation and Courbet, which were the largest central battery ships ever built by any navy. They are sometimes called the Courbet class, as she had begun construction first, though Dévastation was launched and completed earlier.

She displaced . As was standard for French capital ships of the period, she had a pronounced ram bow. She was fitted with three pole masts equipped with spotting tops for her main battery guns. The crew numbered 689 officers and enlisted men. Her propulsion machinery consisted of two compound steam engines with steam provided by twelve coal-burning fire-tube boilers. To supplement the steam engines, she was equipped with a three-masted schooner rig, though this was quickly removed.

Her main battery consisted of four , 21-caliber guns mounted in a central, armored casemate. Two guns could fire ahead on a limited arc and two could fire astern. These were supported by a secondary battery four  guns and a tertiary battery of six  guns. The 240 mm guns were in open, unarmored barbettes on the upper deck; two were placed abreast the funnels, the third forward, and the fourth gun was located aft. For defense against torpedo boats, she carried twelve  1-pounder Hotchkiss revolver cannon, all in individual mounts. Her armament was rounded out with five  torpedo tubes in above-water launchers.

Modifications
Courbet was modernized several times throughout her career. In 1894, her light armament was revised to include eighteen  guns and seven 37 mm revolver cannon. The light guns that had been present in her upper fighting tops were removed, as were the two forward torpedo tubes. In addition, the gun shields fitted to the barbette guns were replaced with vertical armor plates on the front. The ship also received new fire-tube boilers to replace the worn-out boilers. The Navy had intended to completely rearm the ship, but a change in naval ministers led to a shift in priorities, so the alterations to the main and secondary batteries were deferred. Additional work was carried out between September 1899 and December 1900. Her existing masts and bowsprit were removed, and two larger military masts with two fighting tops apiece were installed in their place. Her 270 mm guns were removed; the bow position received a 138.6 mm 30-caliber M1881/84 gun, while the three barbette positions had 240 mm 40-caliber M1893 guns. Her light battery was revised again slightly, to sixteen of the 47 mm guns, eight 37 mm revolvers, and two 37 mm guns.

Service history

Construction – 1890

The ship was laid down at Toulon on 19 July 1875, and was launched on 27 April 1882. After she had been launched, she broke from her mooring in a strong wind and ran aground. Originally named Foudroyant ("Lightning"), she was renamed to honor Admiral Amédée Courbet on 25 June 1885, who had died of cholera after leading French naval forces through much of the Sino-French War. The ship was commissioned on 1 August 1885 for sea trials, and in December, she had her armament installed. Trials were conducted off Toulon into 1886, and she was placed in full commission on 1 October, though trials continued until 18 March 1887. She thereafter joined the Mediterranean Fleet. In May 1887, Courbet took part in exercises to practice convoy escort; the French Army kept significant forces in French North Africa, and these units would have to be transported back to Europe in the event of a major conflict. A squadron of cruisers and torpedo boats was tasked with intercepting the convoy. The convoy used bad weather to make the passage, as heavy seas kept the torpedo boats from going to sea. In August, she represented France at the International Maritime Exhibition at Cadiz, before visiting Tangier.

Courbet participated in the 1889 fleet exercises in company with eight other ironclads and numerous smaller craft. She served as part of the simulated enemy force during the maneuvers, which lasted from 30 June to 6 July. On 3 July, Courbet conducted a simulated bombardment of Saint-Cyr-sur-Mer and La Ciotat. During the maneuvers, Courbet accidentally collided with the old unprotected cruiser , badly damaging her. Courbet and the torpedo cruiser  escorted D'Estrées back to Toulon on 4 July. The next day, Courbet and several other vessels attacked Cette. The exercises concluded with a simulated amphibious landing at Hyères carried out by the enemy squadron on 6 July, which the defending force was unable to prevent. A second round of exercises was held later that month, beginning on 23 July. The enemy squadron conducted a simulated attack on Toulon that night, but poor weather prevented further operations and the maneuvers were cancelled later on the 24th.

Joint maneuvers were held in 1890 with the combined Mediterranean Fleet and Northern Squadron. The ships of the Mediterranean Fleet arrived in Brest on 2 July and began the maneuvers four days later; the exercises ended on 25 July. A series of mechanical problems and accidents plagued the vessels of the combined fleet; on 22 July, Courbets rudder broke off and the ship was out of action for a day while repairs were carried out. Three days later, Courbet had to come to the assistance of the torpedo gunboat , which was unable to steam after the feed pump for her boilers broke down. Several other vessels suffered from similar problems. Later that year, she was transferred to the 2nd Division of the Mediterranean Fleet, along with Dévastation and Redoutable. That year, the ship main battery guns were condemned after an accident aboard Amiral Duperré and a subsequent investigation revealed that all of the 340 mm guns in French service were defective. Courbet had her guns replaced with weapons of the older M1875 version, though they were the same diameter and length as the defective guns.

1891–1910

Courbet again participated in the fleet maneuvers of 1891 in the 1st Division, along with Dévastation and Formidable. The maneuvers began on 23 June and lasted until 11 July, during which Courbet operated as part of the "French" fleet, opposing a simulated hostile force that attempted to attack the southern French coast. The ship remained in the Mediterranean Fleet in 1893, along with her sister, Amiral Duperré, the two  ships, and the newer ironclads  and the three  vessels. That year, she sailed to the eastern Mediterranean. She participated in the 1893 maneuvers, again as part of the 1st Division in company with Formidable and Redoutable. The maneuvers included an initial period of exercises from 1 to 10 July and then larger-scale maneuvers from 17 to 28 July. Courbet was docked in Toulon in 1894 for modernization, which included the replacement of her six old 140 mm guns with ten new model weapons of the same caliber. Fourteen  guns were also added to the light armament, and the number of 37 mm revolvers was reduced to seven.

Courbet remained in service with the Mediterranean Fleet through 1895, by which time the unit consisted of Dévastation, the two Amiral Baudins, and the three Marceaus, along with several cruisers and torpedo vessels. The ship visited Tunisia and Algeria that year. During that year's maneuvers, which began on 1 July, the 1st Squadron conducted a training cruise and practice shooting while the Reserve Squadron mobilized its ships. The main period of exercises saw the fleet divided into three units and Courbet was assigned to the first unit, which was tasked with effecting a rendezvous at sea with the second squadron and then attacking Ajaccio. The maneuvers concluded on 27 July. On 13 November 1895, while the fleet was steaming into Hyères, Formidable turned too widely and led the line of ironclads into shallow water. Several of the vessels ran aground, including Courbet, which was the fourth vessel in line. She remained stuck fast for two days before she could be pulled free, though she was not damaged in the accident. The composition of the Mediterranean Fleet changed little in 1896, apart from the addition of the new pre-dreadnought battleship . That year's maneuvers lasted from 6 to 30 July and took place off the coast of French Algeria. She remained in the unit in 1897. In April, she was dry-docked for another modernization that lasted until June.

The ship began 1898 in the Mediterranean Fleet, which now included four pre-dreadnoughts and three other ironclads, but she was decommissioned in February to refit, which included the installation of new water-tube boilers. According to the contemporary journal The Naval Annual, the main battery guns were replaced with 270 mm guns, but according to Campbell, these guns were only installed aboard Dévastation. In 1899, she visited Lisbon, Portugal, and Cadiz, Vigo, and Ferrol, Spain. Courbet  made another stop in Vigo that year, and also stopped in Lagos, Portugal, and Toulon and Ajaccio. During the fleet maneuvers that year, the Northern Squadron steamed south for joint maneuvers with the Mediterranean Fleet. The Northern Squadron ships formed part of the hostile force, and as it was entering the Mediterranean from the Atlantic, represented a German squadron attempting to meet its Italian allies. The exercises began on 3 July and concluded on 28 July. In August and September, the Northern Squadron conducted amphibious assault exercises. On 28 August, they escorted a group of troop ships from Brest to La Rochelle, which the ships bombarded, neutralized the coastal defenses, and put some 6,000 men ashore.

In early 1902, the Northern Squadron was reorganized, leaving Courbet, Masséna, and Formidable in the unit that year, along with four coastal defense ships. During the 1902 fleet maneuvers, which began on 7 July, the Northern Squadron attempted to force a passage through the Strait of Gibraltar. The squadron was unable to effect the passing unobserved by the Mediterranean Squadron's cruisers, but the Northern Squadron commander was able to shake his pursuers long enough to prevent them from intercepting his force before the end of the exercises on 15 July. Further maneuvers with the combined fleet took place, including a simulated battle where Courbet and the other ships of the Northern Squadron represented the British Mediterranean Fleet; the exercises concluded on 5 August. She thereafter sailed from Toulon to Brest, where she was put into reserve in 1904. She was decommissioned on 21 October 1908, struck from the naval register on 5 February 1909, and sold for scrap on 25 August 1910.

Notes

References

Further reading
 

Dévastation-class ironclads
1882 ships
Maritime incidents in April 1882